In fluid mechanics, the Tait equation is an equation of state, used to relate liquid density to hydrostatic pressure.  The equation was originally published by Peter Guthrie Tait in 1888 in the form 

Tait-Tammann equation of state 
In 1895, the original isothermal Tait equation was replaced by Tammann with an equation of the form

where  is the isothermal mixed bulk modulus.
This above equation is popularly known as the Tait equation.
The integrated form is commonly written

where
 is the specific volume of the substance (in units of ml/g or m3/kg)
 is the specific volume at 

Pressure formula 
The expression for the pressure in terms of the specific volume is

The special case of the supercooled phase of water is discussed in Appendix D of reference.

Tait-Murnaghan equation of state 

Another popular isothermal equation of state that goes by the name "Tait equation" is the Murnaghan model which is sometimes expressed as

Pressure formula 
This equation, in pressure form, can be written as

For pure water, typical parameters are  = 101,325 Pa,  = 1000 kg/cu.m,  = 2.15 GPa, and  = 7.15.

Note that this form of the Tate equation of state is identical to that of the Murnaghan equation of state.

Bulk modulus formula 
The tangent bulk modulus predicted by the MacDonald–Tait model is

Tumlirz–Tammann–Tait equation of state 

A related equation of state that can be used to model liquids is the Tumlirz equation (sometimes called the Tammann equation and originally proposed by Tumlirz in 1909 and Tammann in 1911 for pure water).  This relation has the form

The Tumlirz–Tammann version of the Tait equation for fresh water, i.e., when , is

Pressure formula 
The inverse Tumlirz–Tammann–Tait relation for the pressure as a function of specific volume is

Bulk modulus formula 

Modified Tait equation of state 
Following in particular the study of underwater explosions and more precisely the shock waves emitted, J.G. Kirkwood proposed in 1965 a more appropriate form of equation of state to describe high pressures (>1 kbar) by expressing the isentropic compressibility coefficient as

where  represents here the entropy.
 is dimensionless
 has the same units as 

The integration leads to the following expression for the volume  along the isentropic 

where .

Pressure formula 
The expression for the pressure  in terms of the specific volume along the isentropic  is

See also 
 Equation of state

References 

Equations of state
Fluid mechanics